George Lord (1818–1880) was an Australian politician.

This name may also refer to:
George deForest Lord (1919–2012), American academic
George Edwin Lord (1846–1876), American military surgeon 
George P. Lord (1831–1917), American politician